Two males athletes from Azerbaijan competed at the 1996 Summer Paralympics in Atlanta, United States.

See also
Azerbaijan at the Paralympics
Azerbaijan at the 1996 Summer Olympics

References 

Nations at the 1996 Summer Paralympics
1996
Summer Paralympics